John Gallacher may refer to:

John Gallacher (politician) (1920–2004), British co-operative official and politician

John Gallacher (footballer, born 1951), Scottish football player
John Gallacher (footballer, born 1969), Scottish football player

See also  
John Gallagher (disambiguation)